The Stormlight Archive is a series of epic fantasy novels written by American author Brandon Sanderson, planned to consist of ten novels. As of 2022, the series comprises four published novels and two novellas. The first novel, The Way of Kings, was published on August 31, 2010. The second novel, Words of Radiance, was published in 2014 and debuted at number one on The New York Times Best Seller List, followed by Oathbringer in 2017 and Rhythm of War in 2020. A fifth novel, under the working title Knights of Wind and Truth, is expected to be released in November 2024, while writing for the latter half of the series will begin after Sanderson finishes writing the upcoming Era Three Mistborn trilogy.

Publication history
Sanderson completed the first draft of The Way of Kings in 2003, though the original manuscript differed significantly from the published text. Sanderson referred to the prospective series as The Oathshards Series in 2004. The first draft of the manuscript was among over a dozen books written before his debut publication Elantris (2005). The book was substantially rewritten between then and its 2010 publication. Six chapters of this early version were included in the anthology Altered Perceptions (2014). The original version of the book is available on the author's official website.

From June to August 2010, Tor Books published sample chapters from The Way of Kings on its official website, along with an introduction by Sanderson. In its first week of release, The Way of Kings was No. 7 on The New York Times Best Seller list. In subsequent weeks the book was No. 11, No. 20, and No. 25.

In October 2010, Brandon Sanderson revealed that his tentative plan was to release the second book in the series in 2012, approximately two years after the release of the first book, due to writing the final book of The Wheel of Time, followed by the third book about a year later. However, after completing the first draft of A Memory of Light, Sanderson revealed the book would be pushed back to a 2014 release, almost four years after the first book. The second book was initially titled Highprince of War (referring to Highprince Dalinar), but Sanderson decided to focus the second book on Shallan, tentatively titling it The Book of Endless Pages and eventually settling on Words of Radiance with Highprince Dalinar's book as the third novel, titled Oathbringer.

The first draft of the fourth book was completed in December 2019. The title, Rhythm of War, was announced on the Tor website on February 10, 2020. The cover was revealed six months later, on August 17. The book was finished in July 2020. In a Facebook post, the author revealed that the final word count is "roughly 460,000" words, around the length of Oathbringer, and the book consists of 112 chapters, plus differently numbered interludes, a prologue, and an epilogue. Rhythm of War was published on November 17, 2020.

Books

Ten books are planned in the series, broken down into two sets of five books each. Sanderson describes the planned story arc of the second set of five books as a "sequel" to the first set, with some appearances of characters from the first set. The biggest timeskip in the series will occur between the fifth and sixth book.

As of 2020, two novellas have been published. The first novella, titled Edgedancer and featuring the character Lift, is set between Words of Radiance and Oathbringer and was originally published in Arcanum Unbounded: The Cosmere Collection in 2016. A standalone edition of Edgedancer was published on October 17, 2017. The second novella, Dawnshard, featuring the characters Rysn and Lopen, was published in November 2020 and takes place in the one-year gap between Oathbringer and Rhythm of War.

Concepts

World
Roshar is the native name for the planet on which The Stormlight Archive is set. It is also the name of the supercontinent on which the main events of the series take place. People from Roshar are called Rosharans. Roshar is the second planet from its sun and has three moons, each of which waxes and wanes separately from the others. The world is regularly  assaulted by highstorms, storms characterized by a very violent storm front traveling from east to west (beginning at the Origin), followed by weaker rains. The lands in Shinovar, farthest west on the main continent of Roshar, are mostly protected from the highstorms by the high peaks of the Misted Mountains. Most plants that grow in Shinovar, which resemble real-world plant life, cannot grow in other parts of Roshar. Highstorms come frequently and, though they do not appear to follow a simple pattern, stormwardens are able to accurately predict their schedule through complex mathematics. Flora and fauna have evolved to cope with this condition.

Nations and regions
During the Heraldic Epochs, Roshar was ruled by a coalition of ten nations known as the Silver Kingdoms. In the Era of Solitude, following the departure of the Heralds and the demise of the Orders of Knights Radiant, those kingdoms split into smaller ones, some of more important being:

 Alethkar
 Jah Keved
 Herdaz
 Thaylenah
 Kharbranth and Natani cities in the Frostlands
 Numerous Makabaki countries, with Azir being most prominent
 Shinovar
 Rira and Iri

Races
The Stormlight Archive features several different races, although most are often portrayed as different ethnicities of humans. Some of these races include:

 Thaylens: Renowned traders and merchants native to an island nation. They possess long eyebrows that can be styled to either droop or curve behind their ears.
 Alethi: Native to the nation of Alethkar, the Alethi are members of one of the four Vorin nations. They have a famed military heritage and are possessed of tan skin and dark hair.
 Veden: Native to the Vorin nation of Jah Keved, the Vedens are characterized by pale skin and black hair. Some have red hair, indicating Unkalaki ancestry.
 Natanatani: Native to the Vorin nation inhabiting New Natanan, the Natanatani often wear gloves and have faintly bluish skin.
 Unkalaki (Horneaters): A relatively rare race, the Horneaters are called thus by other races because the Unkalaki consider animal horns, shells, and claws to be a delicacy. The Unkalaki homeland is in the mountains of Jah Keved. Their culture is very different from the other Vorin cultures.
 Parshendi (Singers/Listeners): A proud nonhuman race, living on Shattered Plains with a strong warrior culture. The Parshendi are viewed by many other races as savages because of their culture and past deeds. They have marbled red and white or red and black skin that forms patterns unique to each individual, and are at war with the Alethi during the novels' main timeline. They use spren to morph into many different forms, each with a unique function and set of abilities. These forms also change the appearance of the Parshendi who use them, for example taking warform makes them more physically able and grants them the mindset of a soldier. The workform allows them to be sturdier to perform physical labor. They also communicate through songs and rhythms in their heads. At the start of the series, many members of this species are found in a mentally limited form known as Parshmen, who are enslaved by various human groups.
 Shin: A race native to the region of Shinovar, Shin have white skin and lack epicanthic folds (unlike the other races). They stand shorter than most others, averaging five feet tall. They also have bigger and rounder eyes. 
 Makabaki: Native to the nation of Azir and neighboring countries, Makabaki have dark skin and hair. 
  Reshi: A people native to the Reshi Isles
 Dysian Aimians: otherwise known as the Sleepless. A non-human race native to Aimia, but of otherworldly origin. They are made of many small creatures with exoskeletons, called hordlings. There are 24 known Sleepless on Roshar. 
 Siah Aimians: a non-human race also native to Aimia. They are characterized as having white-blue skin and shadows that point the wrong way. They can also change their bodies slightly, for example adding a tattoo mentally, or removing their sense of smell.

Class structure
Much of The Way of Kings takes place within the nations of Alethkar and Jah Keved. Both of these nations divide their people into classes, primarily based on the color of their eyes. Those with dark eye colors (brown, dark green, charcoal grey) are mostly peasants (and can even be made slaves). Those with light eye colors (blue, yellow, tan, green, violet, orange, etc.) are the nobles and generally more educated ruling class. Within these classes, there are further class distinctions known as nahn (for darkeyes) and dahn (for lighteyes). Both have ten levels within. For the nahn, they range from slaves in the 10th nahn to full citizens with the right to travel in the second and first nahn. In the dahn system, lighteyes in the 10th dahn are considered only slightly better than darkeyes, and a very rich darkeyed man or woman may marry into an extremely poor lighteyed family, in very rare cases. The first dahn is composed of the king and his family. Any person above fourth dahn is a Brightlord/Brightlady, owners of swaths of property, servants, estates, etc. It has been known for dark eyed individuals to obtain light eyes through feats performed in the world; however, this is exceptionally rare.

Spren
Spren are spirits in the land of Roshar which are drawn to different conditions or emotions. There are thousands of varieties. One character, Hesina, the mother of Kaladin states, "Spren appear when something changes - when fear appears, or when it begins to rain. They are the heart of change, and therefore the heart of all things." Their intelligence varies, with Cryptics (also known as liespren though they themselves dislike the term)  and honorspren among the most intelligent, and more common spren, seen as forces of nature/emotion having little to no intelligence. Jasnah Kholin also mentions that the 10 orders of the Knights Radiant drew their power from spren. Some notable spren are Syl, an Honorspren who shares a bond with Kaladin, giving him surgebinding powers of Windrunner; Pattern, who created a bond with Shallan, allowing her to surgebind and soulcast; and Wyndle, who bonded with the thief Lift, allowing her to surgebind. Dalinar Kholin also bonds a spren, the Stormfather, though he does so in an unconventional manner. Jasnah bonded an inkspren named Ivory.

Some spren, such as flamespren, share characteristics with current observations in quantum mechanics, and are based on them. For example, when they are observed they remain stable in the recorded state, but when tested more thoroughly, they change as though at random.

As revealed in the second book, Spren are "concepts and ideas" given physical form by the human collective subconscious. Among the many forms of spren, some are intelligent, possess self-awareness, and have even built their own cities. They reside naturally in Shadesmar, and often cross over into the physical realm. This comes at the cost of most of their self-awareness for the higher, more exalted spren, which they can regain by making bonds with humans. The sea and land are reversed in Shadesmar—what would be land on Roshar is a sea of black beads in Shadesmar, each representing a physical form on Roshar. Shadesmar also contains cities and a strange type of flora.

Surgebinding
Surgebinding refers to a group of ten magic systems that stem from Honor and Cultivation, two of the three Shards of Adonalsium present on Roshar. Each of Surgebinding's ten systems revolves around 'binding' two natural 'Surges,' for instance Gravity and Adhesion, to the Surgebinder's will. Surgebinding is powered by Stormlight, and the ability is granted to humans through bonding with a Spren, a type of elemental spirit native to Roshar. There are ten Surgebinding's branches, with Windrunning and powers of Lightweavers (Transformation - Soulcasting and Illumination - illusions), described thoroughly.

Windrunning is an ability where the wielder uses the power of Stormlight to affect gravity and adhesion. It is described in three methods known as the "Three Lashings". A Basic Lashing changes the direction of gravitational pull for an individual (causing the person to be pulled towards another object or direction instead of towards the center of the planet). A Full Lashing is described as creating an almost unbreakable bond between two objects until the Stormlight dissipates. A Reverse Lashing causes an object to have a much stronger gravitational pull, causing other objects to be pulled towards it.

The only individuals in the book seen to use Windrunning are Szeth-son-son-Vallano, Kaladin, the squires of Kaladin in Bridge Four, and through the visions of Dalinar, members of the Knights Radiant.

Soulcasting and Shadesmar
Soulcasting is a practice where objects are changed from one form to another. It has proven able to turn rock into smoke, purify blood of poisons, and create food, among  many other applications. Soulcasting is done by means of a device called a soulcaster that is powered by gems imbued with Stormlight. The type of gem placed inside the soulcaster determines what the caster can transform. With each use of a soulcaster, there is a chance of the gem cracking and being destroyed, especially when a large amount of matter is changed. The main practitioners of soulcasting are the Ardents of the Vorin religion, however there are a few exceptions. Shallan's father's steward knew how to use a soulcaster, as he used Shallan's father's soulcaster.

By the end of The Way of Kings, Jasnah Kholin and Shallan are capable of doing magic that has very similar effects to Soulcasting but does not require a soulcaster to be used, and does not require that the magic user be in physical contact with the object they transform. This book does not go into great detail, but the magic involves mentally communicating with an unknown source to enter a place called Shadesmar. Shadesmar is described in detail in the book but mostly consists of a world made from tiny glass beads. Once within Shadesmar the power from a Stormlight infused gem can be used to manipulate objects.

In an interview with Brandon Sanderson, Shadesmar is described as a Cognitive Realm connecting all the worlds in the Cosmere. Sanderson has confirmed that Hoid is very good at using Shadesmar, that this is how Hoid moves between worlds, and that people on other worlds within the Cosmere have ways of accessing Shadesmar which are different from those the characters in this book use.

Shardblades and Shardplate
Shardblades are powerful swords which have the ability to cut through any non-living matter with ease. When used on living creatures, they can kill or maim with a single cut by the blade passing through the living soul. They can also render limbs useless, when they cut through them. The only known defenses against a Shardblade are Shardplate, shields called "half-shards", another Shardblade, or an aluminum blade (according to "Rhythm of War"). Those who own a Shardblade can summon their blade from thin air in ten heartbeats, and can make their blade disappear at will. The blades are rare and highly valued, and there are estimated to be fewer than one hundred known blades in the world.

Shardplate is full plate armor which both protects and strengthens their wearer. The armor provides protection against Surgebinding, as one wearing the armor cannot be "lashed" directly. Repeated strikes at the same spot on the armor by regular weapons or Shardblades can cause the armor to crack and break. The armor can be repaired or "regrown", though it takes a long time.

A full shardbearer, one wielding both Shardblade and Shardplate, is a force capable of turning the tide of battle on their own. Kaladin and Syl express a revulsion to the Shardblades wielded by the Alethi. During Dalinar's visions he sees the Knights Radiant wearing Shardplate and wielding Shardblades, but he notes that the plate when worn by the Radiants glow. Additionally, the number of Blades and Plate worn by the Radiants is much greater than the number left in the world at the main timeline of The Way of Kings. Most Shardblades are actually dead spren that come alive for a period of time by attuning themselves to their owner's heartbeat.

Shardblades wielded by the Knights Radiant are the Knight's spren taking the physical form of a weapon (often a sword, but can take the form of any weapon, or a shield), hence these Shardblades are a physical manifestation of a living spren. 'Living' Shardblades can be summoned instantly, and do not require the summoning period of ten heartbeats. There are also ten Honorblades that each grant the powers of one order of Radiants. These weapons don't appear to be physical manifestations of spren, dead or alive, and were wielded by The Heralds until nine of them were abandoned at the end of Aharietiam, or the last desolation. Szeth, the assassin in white, uses an Honorblade of Jezrien in the first two books, and the Herald, Nalan, wields the Honorblade of the Skybreakers.

The Knights Radiant
The Knights Radiant originated through spren copying the abilities which the Heralds obtained through their Honorblades. The Knights Radiant gained their power through spren by creating a bond with them called the Nahel bond. The bond gives the spren sentience while giving the human Surgebinding abilities. Two examples are Sylphrena, an Honorspren, who shares a bond with Kaladin, giving him the power to Surgebind; and Pattern, a Liespren (Cryptic), who shares a bond with Shallan, granting her power to Soulcast and create Illusions.

The Knights Radiant lived by their order's Five Ideals, called The Immortal Words, with the First Ideal being the same for every order: Life before death, strength before weakness, journey before destination. The other four Ideals are different for each order, with the exception of the Order of the Lightweavers, having only the First Ideal. Lightweavers instead must admit truths to themselves in order to progress. Towards the end of The Way of Kings, Kaladin utters the Second Ideal for the Order of Windrunners: I will protect those who cannot protect themselves. Near the end of Words of Radiance, Kaladin whispers the Third Ideal for the Order of Windrunners: I will protect even those I hate, so long as it is right. At the climax of “Rhythm of War” he speaks the Fourth Ideal: I accept that there will be those I cannot protect.

Orders of the Knights Radiant
 Windrunners: Manipulate the Surges of Adhesion and Gravitation. Bonded to Honorspren.
 Skybreakers: Manipulate the Surges of Gravitation and Division. Bonded to Highspren.
 Dustbringers: Manipulate the Surges of Division and Abrasion. Bonded to Ashspren.
 Edgedancers: Manipulate the Surges of Abrasion and Progression. Bonded to Cultivationspren.
 Truthwatchers: Manipulate the Surges of Progression and Illumination. Bonded to Mistspren.
 Lightweavers: Manipulate the Surges of Illumination and Transformation. Bonded to Liespren (Cryptic).
 Elsecallers: Manipulate the Surges of Transformation and Transportation. Bonded to Inkspren.
 Willshapers: Manipulate the Surges of Transportation and Cohesion. Bonded to Lightspren.
 Stonewards: Manipulate the Surges of Cohesion and Tension. Bonded to Peakspren.
 Bondsmiths: Manipulate the Surges of Tension and Adhesion. Bonded to Godspren. There can only be three Bondsmiths.

Religion
Much of the world follows the Vorin religion. Vorinism tells of a struggle between forces of the Voidbringers and humanity. The Voidbringers forced humanity out of its afterlife, called the Tranquiline Halls. They believe that upon death the soul continues in its past role, but towards the regaining of the Tranquiline Halls. In Alethkar, a man's highest calling is as a warrior in life to remain a warrior in the afterlife. The religion also tells of the Lost Radiants, an order who once fought against the Voidbringers during the wars against them on Roshar (known as Desolations). Vorinism gave the Knights Radiant the moniker "Lost Radiants" after they apparently betrayed humanity at some point in the distant past. Vorinism is arranged in devotaries, whose ardents aim to assist people in advancing their Callings, which are tasks to which one dedicates their life as a method of worship. Each person selects a devotary based on variances in beliefs, talents or personality traits, and may change their selection at any point in their life. Some examples are the Devotary of Sincerity, who are encouraged to learn and ask questions, and the Devotary of Denial. Adolin Kholin's calling, for example, is Dueling. The priesthood of the Vorin religion are referred to as ardents.

Those who reject the existence of the Almighty, such as Jasnah Kholin, are referred to as heretics. Followers of other religions mentioned in The Way of Kings are Stone Shamans, Ysperists and Maakians.

Reception

Critical response and sales

The Way of Kings
In its first week of release The Way of Kings was No. 7 on The New York Times Best Seller list. In subsequent weeks the book was No. 11, No. 20, and No. 25.

An early review from the website Unshelved gave The Way of Kings a positive review. A review from Elitist Book Reviews pointed out small problems with the book, (black-and-white characters, too much exposition) but gave an overall positive opinion of the book. The website SFReviews.net gave the book a mixed review, praising Sanderson's writing and creativity, but criticizing its extreme length and overall dearth of action.

SF Reviews pointed out, "The ride is luxurious, the scenery is often breathtaking, but The Way of Kings is truly a long and winding road." KeepingTheDoor.com commented, "The Stormlight Archive is a series that, like Robert Jordan's The Wheel of Time, George R. R. Martin's A Song of Ice and Fire and Robin Hobb's The Realm of the Elderlings epics, every fantasy fan worth their salt must read and be familiar with. This will be one of the giant series that will help shape the entire scene. Take a week off work now and go and buy The Way of Kings. You won't regret it."

Words of Radiance
In its first week of release, Words of Radiance debuted at No. 1 on The New York Times Hardcover Fiction Best Seller list. It also reached No. 1 on the combined print/ebook bestseller list and the Kobo Bestseller list. It was at No. 3 on the National Indie Bestseller list, and at No. 6 on the Southern California Independent Bookseller Association bestselling hardcover fiction list. The UK publisher of the book, Gollancz, debuted with Words of Radiance at No. 2 on the Sunday Times of London Bestseller list.

A review written by io9 called the book "an old-school, '90s fantasy-style behemoth", also commenting, "While Sanderson continues to build his characters and reveal who they are (especially in the case of Shallan's past) it still clings to one overarching plot that drives relentlessly to an ending that can only be described as 'epic'."

Another review published by Tor Books commented, "Words of Radiance capitalizes on the groundwork provided by The Way of Kings, building up the world and system while revealing many more potential points of speculation." It also said, "So to you, lucky reader, who have the choice of whether or not to buy the book, I give this advice. The journey will be worth it. Yes, you should buy this book. Yes, this is a series worth following to the end. I'm glad to be taking this journey, and I hope you will as well."

Oathbringer
Similar to its predecessor, Oathbringer debuted at No. 1 on The New York Times Hardcover Fiction Bestseller list. It also debuted at No. 1 on the Audible list, No. 2 on the NY Times combined print/ebook bestseller list and No. 6 on the Sunday Times of London hardcover list in the United Kingdom.

In a review for The A.V. Club, Samantha Nelson commented that "Oathbringer shows that Sanderson’s story might not be powerful enough to last the 10 books the author has planned. The book does have some surprises, with heroic deeds not always going as well as planned, and there’s a lot of great humor", concluding that "Sanderson needs to keep things fresh if their battle is going to be worth continuing."

Aidan Moher for Barnes & Noble said, in a more positive review, that "Three volumes deep into the Stormlight Archive, Sanderson continues to deliver on every promise the genre has ever made. It’s got a ton of action and warfare and it adds new layers to his trademark magic systems."

Rhythm of War
Rhythm of War, like the previous two novels in the series, debuted at No. 1 on The New York Times Hardcover Fiction Bestseller list. It also debuted at No. 1 on the NY Times combined print/ebook list and the Amazon Top 20 Most Sold Books of the Week list. In the U.K., Rhythm of War debuted at No. 3 on the Sunday Times of London hardcover list.

Joshua S Hill of Fantasy Book Review gave the book a 4/10, stating that "Rhythm of War was more of a slog than it needed to be", going on to state that "Not only does this book bring with it any of the normal difficulties with reviewing one book in the middle of a much longer series, or such a lengthy book as this (1,220 pages), but Sanderson is quite obviously positioning ‘The Stormlight Archive’ as the great magnum opus of his career and, therefore, the foundational connection upon which all other “Cosmere” books hinge."

In a more positive review, Bill Capossere of Fantasy Literature gave Rhythm of War four out of five stars, stating, "Rhythm of War is absolutely a fun read, an interesting read, mostly a compelling read despite some bogging down here and there." He went on to state that "It’s not my favorite book in the series (that would be Words of Radiance), but Sanderson, besides being amazingly prolific, is also amazingly consistent, almost always falling for me in the 4 to 4.5 range."

Awards and nominations

Adaptations

Audiobooks
Unabridged audiobook versions of the first four books were released by Macmillan Audio and read by narrator team Kate Reading and Michael Kramer. The Way of Kings was released in August 2010, Words of Radiance in March 2014, Oathbringer in November 2017, and Rhythm of War in November 2020.

GraphicAudio published a five-part version of The Way of Kings from March to July 2016, a five-part version of Words of Radiance from September 2016 to January 2017, a six-part version of Oathbringer from April to September 2018, and a six-part version of Rhythm of War beginning December 2020 with the 6th installment scheduled for release December 2021. GraphicAudio also published a version of the Stormlight Archive novella Edgedancer in December 2018.

Films
In October 2016, the rights to the entire Cosmere universe were licensed by DMG Entertainment which was working on an adaptation of The Way of Kings. Patrick Melton and Marcus Dunstan were hired as screenwriters. DMG founder Dan Mintz was to produce the film, with Sanderson and Joshua Bilmes serving as executive producers. In 2016, DMG also intended on simultaneously adapting the first book in Sanderson's Mistborn series.

As of December 2020, all rights except those to The Stormlight Archive have reverted to Sanderson.

Video game
A VR game, The Way of Kings: Escape the Shattered Plains, developed by Arcturus VR, was released on March 2, 2018.

References

External links
 
 
 The Stormlight Archive. Mormon Literature & Creative Arts Database.
 The Complete Spren Catalogue at Tor.com
 A Field Guide To Roshar at Tor.com
 The series page on the Coppermind, the  Brandon Sanderson wiki

 
Fantasy novel series
Novels set on fictional planets
Tor Books books